Saurophthirus is an extinct genus of giant stem-group flea, and the only member of the family Saurophthiridae. The type species, S. longipes is found in early Cretaceous strata of Baissa, Siberia. Two other species S. exquisitus and S. laevigatus are from the Lower Cretaceous Yixian Formation of China.

Description

They are generally seen as transitional between more primitive stem-fleas such as Pseudopulicidae and Tarwinia and modern fleas.

References

Siphonaptera genera
Cretaceous insects
Transitional fossils
Cretaceous insects of Asia
Parasites of reptiles
Prehistoric insect genera
Fossil taxa described in 1976